The Great Britain men's national basketball team (also known as GB Basketball or GB) represents Great Britain in international basketball competitions. The national team is administered by British Basketball.

The current governing body for the Great Britain team was formed by the national federations of England (Basketball England), Scotland (Basketballscotland), and Wales (Basketball Wales) on 1 December 2006. Prior to the merger, England, Scotland, and Wales competed independently during international play except for Olympic events.

Great Britain have qualified for the top European tournament, EuroBasket, five times (2009, 2011, 2013, 2017, 2022). Although before or since the alliance, no British team in history has ever qualified for the FIBA World Cup. However, Great Britain has competed at the Olympic Games twice (1948, 2012), in which they hosted.

History

1948 London Olympics
The Great Britain national team debuted as the host for the 1948 London Olympics. The team was placed into Group A to begin the tournament. Although with the advantage of being at home on their side, the team did not capitalize. Great Britain were thoroughly outplayed in their first fixture against Uruguay, and eventually finished last in group play at (0–5). The outcome relegated the national team to the classification round. There they recorded their first tournament victory against Ireland, but fell in their next two matches, to wrap up the event at (1–7) overall.

1960-1992 Olympic Qualifying
After hosting the 1948 Olympic Games, Great Britain were not represented at the Olympic tournament in 1952 or 1956 due to FIBA and the IOC not yet holding a qualifying event. Although spanning from 1960 to 1992, Great Britain failed to qualify for the competition.

British Basketball formed 2006
After London won the right to host the 2012 Summer Olympics, the organisers wanted competitive teams in every sport, including basketball. A Great Britain side was formed for the first time since 1992 on 1 December 2006. The new team secured the help of the NBA's Chicago Bulls' star Luol Deng, as he led the national team to promotion from EuroBasket Division B to Division A. FIBA stated that Great Britain had to improve their competitiveness prior to being granted the spot in the Olympic tournament that would normally be reserved for the host nation.

EuroBasket 2009

In Great Britain's first cycle at the Division A level in 2008, they went through qualification for the EuroBasket 2009. The team would eventually finish on top of Group D, which also included Bosnia and Herzegovina, Czech Republic and Israel to qualify for the finals.

At the first Euro finals for Great Britain after the formation of British Basketball, the national team were drawn into a tough Group C, which featured European heavyweights Spain, and Serbia along with a feisty Slovenia squad. However, the team was overmatched by the international experience those national sides possessed, and ultimately finished at the bottom of the group at (0–3) to be eliminated.

EuroBasket 2011
During August 2010, Great Britain began their qualification campaign for EuroBasket 2011. The team was drawn into Group B, containing Bosnia and Herzegovina, Hungary, Macedonia, and Ukraine. Great Britain went on to finish at the top of the group, and qualified for their second appearance at the finals overall. Heading into their second Euro finals appearance, the British were determined to display a better performance than in 2009. Being drawn into the tournament's Group A, the mindset was different this time around. Many of the players from the previous finals appearance had more experience, which the team used as optimism entering 2011. In the opening match for Great Britain, they were pitted against the host Lithuania. However, Luol Deng, and his game high 25 points for the British was not enough to pull the upset as the team fell to (0–1).

Following Great Britain's tough opening match loss to the Lithuanians, the British were handed two heavy defeats in their next two fixtures against Turkey, and Spain.
However, heading into their fourth match of group play Team GB would earn their first ever victory at the Euro finals, as they defeated Portugal 85–73. 24 hours after their first win, the team turned around and were victorious again; this time over Poland 88–81. Unfortunately, at a record of (2–3) in group play it would not be enough for Great Britain to advance.

2012 London Olympics

On 13 March 2011, FIBA voted 17–3 in favour of Great Britain receiving their host nation spot at the 2012 London Olympics with one condition, they had until 30 June 2012 to decide on whether to merge the three nations that make up the team or disband after the 2016 Olympics in Rio de Janeiro.

On 21 June 2012, Basketball Wales confirmed their intent to reject the proposed merger on the grounds that the arrangement was always intended to be temporary in the build-up to the London Olympics, and that it would not be in the best interests for the sport in Wales for the country to forfeit its national team, when the GB team contained no Welsh players.

For the 2012 Olympic Games, Great Britain was awarded automatic qualification. Entering the group stage, Great Britain struggled in their first two matches against Russia and Brazil, which resulted in loses. In Great Britain's third match of the tournament, they were up against a strong Spain side. However, after a monumental effort from the British, which nearly saw the team pull off a historic upset; they would ultimately succumb to the eventual tournament runners-up 79–78. After the draining loss, Great Britain were completely overwhelmed in their fourth fixture of the tournament; in a disastrous defeat to Australia 75–106. In their final group play game, Great Britain faced China, with both teams already unable to progress to the knockout stage. Team GB would win the game 90–58, making it only the second Olympic victory all-time for Great Britain. Throughout the tournament British star Luol Deng played 173 minutes, more than any other player and also came in the top ten for points and assists.

EuroBasket 2013
In June 2013, Brooklyn Nets assistant coach Joe Prunty was announced as the new head coach of the national team, following the resignation of Chris Finch.

Having participated in the previous Olympic tournament, Great Britain qualified automatically for EuroBasket 2013 in Slovenia. They went into the finals short-handed: Luol Deng was recovering from illness, Pops Mensah-Bonsu did not participate due to an injury and Joel Freeland was also absent, citing commitments with his club. Despite this, Great Britain won their first match against Israel in overtime, but subsequently lost to France and Belgium. Winning their fourth group game against favoured Germany put them on the verge of advancing to the second round of the tournament for the first time in their history. The team went into their final group game against Ukraine needing to win, but Ukraine had been performing better than expected and dispatched Britain 87–68. The team finished equaling their record from the previous tournament, with Daniel Clark leading Great Britain in scoring and defence.

Following their tournament exit it was announced that the governing body for British sports, UK Sport, were to cut the funding for the team after failing to reach the agreed-upon minimum final placing in the tournament. Funding from UK Sport would have been used to aid the team's efforts to qualify for the 2016 Summer Olympics in Rio de Janeiro.

EuroBasket 2015 qualification
For qualification to the 2015 Euro finals, a defeat to Iceland on 20 August meant that the team had failed to qualify for the tournament. This outcome was largely attributed to British Basketball no longer receiving funding from UK Sport; efficiencies had to be made, including cancelling training camps. Further, the team was unable to secure the participation of players such as Luol Deng due to insurance costs, which in turn affected performance, and put the future of the Great Britain team in doubt. Forward Kieron Achara spoke out about how the financial struggles had affected the team.

EuroBasket 2017
After missing the Euro finals in 2015, Great Britain were eager to qualify for EuroBasket 2017. During the qualifiers, the team was placed into Group G, where they needed to finish in the top two in their group to reach qualification. The team eventually succeeded in the process, only finishing behind Hungary, to reach the tournament for the fourth time.

At the finals, Great Britain were drawn in the "group of death" with Belgium, Latvia, Russia, Serbia, and one of the tournament hosts, Turkey. Despite some close performances, GB lost all five of their matches to finish at the bottom of Group D.

After the tournament Tony Garbelotto took over as head coach of the national team from Joe Prunty.

2019 FIBA World Cup qualification
For the process to reach the 2019 FIBA World Cup, Great Britain was placed into Group H during the first round of World Cup qualifiers. However, in their first match at home against Greece, the team would fall in a crushing hard fought affair in overtime 92–95. In their next qualifying fixture, the team would drop another one, on the road this time at Estonia. After the loss, Tony Garbelotto resigned as head coach of Great Britain, and was replaced by Alberto Lorenzo, prior to their next match which they lost at Israel; during the February qualifying window. With an (0–3) record, the team prepared for Greece once again, this time on the road. Although the outcome was similar, another loss for Great Britain, and putting the team in serious danger of being eliminated.

Heading into the final window of the first round of qualifiers, the team notched their first victory during World Cup qualifying at home against Estonia. With a little momentum on their side, all the team needed to do was defeat Israel in the final match of group play. Ultimately, the team would come up short, losing in a close match at home 59–67, erasing any chance for Great Britain to advance.

2020s–present
After Great Britain successfully made it through pre-qualifying for the EuroBasket 2022, at an overall record of (7–1), the team advanced to the final round of qualifiers. Following a defeat in their opening fixture away to Montenegro 81–74, Great Britain earned a tough victory at home against Germany 81–73. The team went on to win three of their next four matches during the qualifying period, including a second win over Germany, which came at the buzzer to clinch a place into the finals. Drawn into Group C at the tournament, however, Great Britain would go winless for the second consecutive EuroBasket to finish in last place.

Competitive record

FIBA World Cup

Olympic Games

EuroBasket

Results and fixtures

2021

2022

2023

Team

Current roster
Roster for the 2023 FIBA World Cup Qualifiers matches on 24 and 27 February 2023 against Belgium and Serbia.

Depth chart

Head coach position

Notable players

Past rosters
1948 Olympic Games: finished 20th among 23 teams

3 Lionel Price, 4 Robert Norris, 5 Stanley Weston, 6 Trevor Davies, 7 Malcolm Finlay, 8 Colin Hunt, 9 Frank Cole, 10 Douglas Legg,11 Ronald Legg, 12 Harry Weston, 13 Alex Eke, 14 Stanley McMeekan, 15 Sydney McMeekan (Coach: Malcolm Finlay)

2009 EuroBasket: finished 13th among 16 teams

4 Jarrett Hart, 5 Kieron Achara, 6 Mike Lenzly, 7 Pops Mensah-Bonsu, 8 Andrew Sullivan, 9 Nick George, 10 Robert Archibald,11 Joel Freeland, 12 Nate Reinking (C), 13 Daniel Clark, 14 Flinder Boyd, 15 Andrew Betts (Coach: Chris Finch)

2011 EuroBasket: finished 13th among 24 teams

4 Ogo Adegboye, 5 Andrew Lawrence, 6 Mike Lenzly, 7 Devon van Oostrum, 8 Andrew Sullivan, 9 Luol Deng, 10 Robert Archibald,11 Joel Freeland, 12 Nate Reinking (C), 13 Daniel Clark, 14 Eric Boateng, 15 Kyle Johnson (Coach: Chris Finch)

2012 Olympic Games: finished 9th among 12 teams

4 Kieron Achara, 5 Andrew Lawrence, 6 Mike Lenzly, 7 Pops Mensah-Bonsu, 8 Andrew Sullivan, 9 Luol Deng, 10 Robert Archibald,11 Joel Freeland, 12 Nate Reinking (C), 13 Daniel Clark, 14 Kyle Johnson, 15 Eric Boateng (Coach: Chris Finch)

2013 EuroBasket: finished 13th among 24 teams

4 Kieron Achara, 5 Andrew Lawrence, 6 Justin Robinson, 7 Devon van Oostrum, 8 Andrew Sullivan, 9 Gareth Murray, 10 Myles Hesson,11 Alasdair Fraser, 12 Daniel Clark (C), 13 Ogo Adegboye, 14 Eric Boateng, 15 Kyle Johnson (Coach: Joe Prunty)

2017 EuroBasket: finished 22nd among 24 teams

0 Jules Dang-Akodo, 1 Kyle Johnson, 3 Ben Mockford, 4 Andrew Lawrence, 5 Teddy Okereafor, 10 Daniel Clark (C), 11 Gareth Murray,13 Eric Boateng, 19 Luke Nelson, 20 Kieron Achara, 26 Gabriel Olaseni, 44 Kofi Josephs (Coach: Joe Prunty)

2022 EuroBasket: finished 24th among 24 teams

00 Ovie Soko, 0 Gabriel Olaseni, 3 Ben Mockford, 6 Luke Nelson, 10 Daniel Clark (C), 13 Kavell Bigby-Williams, 22 Myles Hesson,23 Dwayne Lautier-Ogunleye, 24 Carl Wheatle, 32 Patrick Whelan, 33 Jamell Anderson, 77 Devon van Oostrum (Coach: Nate Reinking)

See also

Sport in Great Britain
Great Britain women's national basketball team
Great Britain men's national under-20 basketball team
Great Britain men's national under-18 basketball team
Great Britain men's national under-16 basketball team
British Basketball League

References

External links

Great Britain FIBA profile
Great Britain National Team – Men at Eurobasket.com
Great Britain Team Records at FIBA Archive

 
Men's national basketball teams
 
2006 establishments in the United Kingdom